The following lists events that happened during 1841 in Chile.

Incumbents
President of Chile: José Joaquín Prieto Vial (-18 September), Manuel Bulnes Prieto (18 September-)

Events

June
26 June - Chilean presidential election, 1841

Births
10 April - Adolfo Rivadeneyra (died 1882)

Deaths
16 August - Fernando Errázuriz Aldunate (born 1777)

References 

 
1840s in Chile
Chile
Chile